A special election was held on June 20, 2017, to determine the member of the United States House of Representatives for South Carolina's 5th congressional district. Representative Mick Mulvaney was nominated by President Donald Trump as director of the Office of Management and Budget and confirmed by the United States Senate on February 16, 2017, necessitating his resignation from the House of Representatives.

State Representative Ralph Norman narrowly defeated Archie Parnell, a senior advisor for Goldman Sachs, 51.0% to 47.9%, in a low-turnout election.

Republican primary

Candidates

Declared
Chad Connelly, former chairman of the South Carolina Republican Party
Ray Craig, international ministry aid worker
Sheri Few, education activist, candidate for Superintendent of Education in 2014 and state house candidate in 2006, 2008 and 2010
Tom Mullikin, attorney and commander of the South Carolina State Guard
Ralph Norman, state representative
Tommy Pope, state representative
Kris Wampler, attorney

Declined
Penry Gustafson, former businesswoman and community advocate of Camden, SC
Gary Simrill, state representative

Endorsements

Polling

First round

*Internal survey for the Sheri Few campaign

Runoff

Results

Democratic primary

Candidates

Declared
Alexis Frank, recent college graduate and army veteran
Les Murphy, United States Marine Corps veteran
Archie Parnell, Goldman Sachs senior adviser

Declined
Thomas McElveen, state senator
John King, state representative
Mandy Powers Norrell, state representative
Fran Person, nominee for this seat in 2016
Vincent Sheheen, state senator and nominee for governor in 2010 and 2014

Results

Libertarian Party

Candidates

Nominated
Victor Kocher

Eliminated at convention
The Libertarian Party nominating convention was held April 1, 2017.
Bill Bledsoe
Nathaniel Cooper

Green Party

Candidates

Nominated
David Kulma, professor at Winthrop University and musician

General election

Candidates
Ralph Norman (Republican)
Archie Parnell (Democratic)
Victor Kocher (Libertarian)
David Kulma (Green)
Josh Thornton (American)

Endorsements

Polling

Results

County results

See also
List of special elections to the United States House of Representatives

References

External links
Official campaign websites
David Kulma (G) for Congress
Ralph Norman (R) for Congress
Archie Parnell (D) for Congress

South Carolina 2017 05
South Carolina 2017 05
2017 05 Special
South Carolina 05 Special
United States House of Representatives 05 Special
United States House of Representatives 2017 05